John Masey Wright (1777–1866) was an English watercolour-painter. He was the son of an organ-builder and was apprenticed to the same business, but, as it proved distasteful to him, he was allowed to follow his natural inclination for art. As a boy he was given the opportunity of watching Thomas Stothard when at work in his studio, but otherwise he was self-taught. About 1810 Wright became associated with Henry Aston Barker, for whose panorama in the Strand he did much excellent work, including the battles of Coruña, Vittoria, and Waterloo.

He was also employed for a time as a scene-painter at the opera-house. But his reputation rests upon his small compositions illustrating Shakespeare and other poets, which were extremely numerous and executed with admirable taste and feeling in the manner of Stothard. He exhibited at the Royal Academy from 1812 to 1818, and in 1824 was elected an associate of the Watercolour Society; he became a full member in 1825, and thenceforward to the end of his long life was a regular exhibitor. His drawings were largely engraved for the ‘Literary Souvenir,’ ‘Amulet,’ ‘Forget-me-not,’ and similar publications; also for fine editions of the works of Sir Walter Scott and Burns, and for the ‘Gallery of Modern British Artists.’ Plates from his Battle of Vitoria’ and ‘The Ghost, a Christmas Frolic,’ appeared in 1814, and ‘Devotion,’ a subject from Boccaccio, was engraved by Charles Heath in 1833. Though extremely industrious, Wright was poorly remunerated for his work, and during his later years received a small pension from the Watercolour Society.

Personal
Wright was born on Tuesday 14 Oct. 1777 at Pentonville, London, where his father was an organ-builder. He died on Sunday 13 May 1866. He married a Miss Meadows and with her had a son and a daughter.

Gallery

References
Freeman Marius O'Donoghue, "John Masey Wright" Dictionary of National Biography, 1885–1900, Volume 63
Roget's Hist. of the ‘Old Watercolour’ Society
Redgrave's Dict. of Artists
Graves's Dict. of Artists, 1760−1893.
"Obituary: J. M. Wright", The Art journal, Volume 6; Volume 19; Volume 29, Publisher Virtue and Co., 1867, page 55

Attribution

External links
"John Masey Wright" by Cundall, Downes & Co, at the National Portrait Gallery
"John Masey Wright (1777-1866), 'The Return of Olivia" at the Victoria and Albert Museum
 , an engraving by William Humphrys of the painting in The Literary Souvenir annual for 1826, with a poem by Felicia Hemans relating how Richard I. was discovered in captivity by Blondel.
 , an engraving by Edward Francis Finden of a painting in the Friendship's Offering annual for 1827, with a poem by Felicia Hemans.

1777 births
1866 deaths
English watercolourists
People from Pentonville
Painters from London